George Adams (c. 1709–1773) was an English instrument maker and science writer. His son George Adams, who carried on the business, was also known as an instrument maker and optician.

Life
He was the eldest surviving son of Morris Adams, a cook, and his wife Mary, and was baptised in 1709. He was an apprentice to instrument makers, James Parker who died, and then Thomas Heath. He went into business in 1734, in Fleet Street, London.

Instruments

Bibliography
Adams was best known for A Treatise Describing the Construction and Explaining the Use of New Celestial and Terrestrial Globes (London: 1766). There were later editions, but the claim of 30 up to 1810 is not now accepted. Other works were:

Micrographia Illustrata, or the knowledge of the microscope explained (1746), which included "a translation of Mr. Joblott's observations on animalculæ", and had four editions to 1771. Henry Baker attacked this book, on grounds of plagiarism.
The Description and Use of a new Sea-quadrant for taking the altitude of the sun from the visible horizon (1748). 
The Description and Use of the Universal Trigonometrical Octant, invented and applied to Hadley's Quadrant (1753).

References

External links
 Family history
 Mathematical Instrument Set
 Short bio on Museo Galileo Virtual Museum

English science writers
British scientific instrument makers
1720s births
1773 deaths
Place of birth unknown
Date of death missing
Place of death missing